The Quebec Environmental Law Centre (QELC; , CQDE) is a non-profit environmental organization whose mission is to ensure the application of the environmental laws and the rights of citizens in environmental matters in Quebec and Canada.

The QELC was founded in 1989 by a group of lawyers interested in environmental law. The organization now regroups senior lawyers and environmental professionals who are regularly involved in important environmental debates.

External links 

Website of the Quebec Environmental Law Centre 

Environmental agencies in Canada
Non-profit organizations based in Quebec
Legal organizations based in Quebec
Environmental law in Canada
ecojustice